Cupidesthes robusta, the robust ciliate blue, is a butterfly in the family Lycaenidae. It is found in eastern Nigeria, Cameroon, the Republic of the Congo and the Central African Republic. The habitat consists of dense, wet forests.

References

Butterflies described in 1895
Lycaenesthini
Butterflies of Africa